Clitocybe is a genus of mushrooms characterized by white, off-white, buff, cream, pink, or light-yellow spores, gills running down the stem, and pale white to brown or lilac coloration. They are primarily saprotrophic, decomposing forest ground litter. There are estimated to be around 300 species in the widespread genus.

Clitocybe means sloping head.

A few members of the genus are considered edible; many others are poisonous, containing the toxin muscarine among others. Distinguishing individual species of Clitocybe is generally prohibitively difficult to non-experts, requiring the analysis of microscopic characters.  Therefore, with the exception of a few charismatic and readily identified members, Clitocybe mushrooms are rarely collected for consumption.

Taxonomy
Clitocybe was originally proposed by Elias Fries in 1821 as a tribe in the genus Agaricus. Friedrich Staude elevated it to generic status in 1857.

Recent molecular work has shown the genus to be polyphyletic: many members are seemingly distantly related and other fungi, such as the field blewit and wood blewit, now known as Clitocybe saeva and C. nuda respectively, are more closely related.

As C. nebularis is the type species, those most distantly related to it would be likely to be reclassified in the future. In a 2003 paper, Finnish mycologist Harri Harmaja proposed C. geotropa and twelve other Clitocybe species be split off into a new genus Infundibulicybe on the basis of spore properties. His  C. clavipes was later transferred to the genus Ampulloclitocybe by Redhead and colleagues, that genus name taking precedence over Harmaja's proposed Clavicybe. Other former Clitocybe species have been placed in the genera Atractosporocybe, Leucocybe and Rhizocybe.

Toxicity
The consumption of two species, Clitocybe acromelalga from Japan, and Clitocybe amoenolens from France, has led to several cases of mushroom-induced erythromelalgia which lasted from 8 days to 5 months.

Many small Clitocybe species contain the toxin muscarine, which was originally found in small amounts in the famous fly agaric. However, the small white Clitocybe species contain muscarine in dangerous amounts, and two species in particular, the closely related Clitocybe dealbata and Clitocybe rivulosa, contain muscarine in such amounts that deaths have been recorded for eating those two Clitocybe species.

Selected species
Clitocybe acromelalga (Japan)
Clitocybe agrestis
Clitocybe albirhiza
Clitocybe alexandri
Clitocybe amarescens
Clitocybe amoenolens – poisonous bamboo mushroom (France), now classified as Paralepistopsis amoenolens
Clitocybe brumalis – winter funnel cap
Clitocybe brunneocephala – edible
Clitocybe candicans - now classified as Leucocybe candicans
Clitocybe catinus - now classified as Infundibulicybe catinus
Clitocybe cerussata
Clitocybe cistophila – Europe
Clitocybe clavipes – may be edible but poisonous when consumed in conjunction with alcohol, now Ampulloclitocybe clavipes
Clitocybe connata – inedible, suspected to be mutagenic; species now reclassified under Leucocybe.
Clitocybe costata – may be edible but due to its rareness it is not consumed.
Clitocybe dealbata – ivory funnel, sweating mushroom (Europe), poisonous
Clitocybe ditopus
Clitocybe dilatata – poisonous
Clitocybe eccentrica
Clitocybe entoloma
Clitocybe eucalyptorum
Clitocybe fennica
Clitocybe fragrans – fragrant funnel
Clitocybe geotropa – trooping funnel, monk's head agaric, now classified as Infundibulicybe geotropa
Clitocybe gilvaoides
Clitocybe glacialis
Clitocybe globispora
Clitocybe glutiniceps
Clitocybe lohjaensis
Clitocybe marginella
Clitocybe maxima - giant clitocybe - edible, now commercially grown in China.
Clitocybe menthiodora
Clitocybe nebularis – clouded agaric – considered edible by some, though causes gastric upset in many people
Clitocybe nuda – wood blewit – a common edible distinguished in part by its lilac hue, now Lepista nuda
Clitocybe odora – aniseed toadstool; grows near birch trees, but can be easily mistaken for poisonous ones mainly because of its appearance
Clitocybe paraditopa – Australia
Clitocybe parasitica
Clitocybe rivulosa – fool's funnel (Europe, North America)
Clitocybe ruderalis
Clitocybe sclerotoidea
Clitocybe strigosa
Clitocybe subcordispora
Clitocybe tarda
Clitocybe truncicola
Clitocybe vibecina

The bioluminescent jack o'lantern mushroom (Omphalotus olearius) was formerly placed in this genus as Clitocybe illudens.

See also

List of Tricholomataceae genera
 Mushroom hunting
 Mushroom poisoning

References

External links

 Clitocybe at Mushroom Expert.com

 
Agaricales genera